The 2001 Conference USA baseball tournament was the 2001 postseason baseball championship of the NCAA Division I Conference USA, held at Zephyr Field in New Orleans, Louisiana, from May 16 through 20.  defeated  in the championship game, earning the conference's automatic bid to the 2001 NCAA Division I baseball tournament.

Regular season results 

 Records reflect conference play only.

Bracket 
{{8TeamBracket-2Elim |groups=y |RD3-legs=2
| RD1-seed01=5
| RD1-team01=
| RD1-score01=8
| RD1-seed02=4
| RD1-team02=
| RD1-score02=5

| RD1-seed03=8
| RD1-team03=
| RD1-score03=8
| RD1-seed04=1
| RD1-team04=
| RD1-score04=4

| RD1-seed05=4
| RD1-team05=Cincinnati
| RD1-score05=7
| RD1-seed06=1
| RD1-team06=Tulane
| RD1-score06=9

| RD1-seed07=7
| RD1-team07=
| RD1-score07=6
| RD1-seed08=2
| RD1-team08=
| RD1-score08=2

| RD1-seed09=6
| RD1-team09=
| RD1-score09=5
| RD1-seed10=3
| RD1-team10=
| RD1-score10=10

| RD1-seed11=6
| RD1-team11=Louisville
| RD1-score11=6
| RD1-seed12=2
| RD1-team12=Houston
| RD1-score12=5

| RD2-seed01=8
| RD2-team01=Charlotte
| RD2-score01=2
| RD2-seed02=5
| RD2-team02=Memphis
| RD2-score02=4

| RD2-seed03=8
| RD2-team03=Charlotte
| RD2-score03=2
| RD2-seed04=1
| RD2-team04=Tulane
| RD2-score04=6

| RD2-seed05=7
| RD2-team05=Southern Miss
| RD2-score05=18
| RD2-seed06=3
| RD2-team06=South Florida
| RD2-score06=5

| RD2-seed07=6
| RD2-team07=Louisville
| RD2-score07=3
| RD2-seed08=3
| RD2-team08=South Florida
| RD2-score08=7

| RD3-seed01=5
| RD3-team01=Memphis
| RD3-score01-1=6
| RD3-score01-2=2
| RD3-seed02=1
| RD3-team02=Tulane
| RD3-score02-1=7
| RD3-score02-2=7

| RD3-seed03=7
| RD3-team03=Southern Miss
| RD3-score03-1=4| RD3-score03-2=4
| RD3-seed04=3
| RD3-team04=South Florida
| RD3-score04-1=6
| RD3-score04-2=7

| RD4-seed01=3
| RD4-team01=South Florida
| RD4-score01=4
| RD4-seed02=1
| RD4-team02=Tulane
| RD4-score02=21
}}

 Bold indicates the winner of the game.
 Italics'' indicate that the team was eliminated from the tournament.

All-tournament team

References 

Tournament
Conference USA Baseball Tournament
Conference USA baseball tournament
Conference USA baseball tournament
2000s in New Orleans
Baseball competitions in New Orleans
College baseball tournaments in Louisiana